Betty Zhou is a Chinese actress, singer, producer, sports commentator and television host. She hosts her show Talking to Hollywood with Betty Zhou on CCTV.

She is active in China & Singapore. In 2013, she became the first bilingual anchor from China to cover the NBA finals.

Early life

Betty Zhou was born in the Jiangsu Province of China.  When she was younger, Zhou had dreamt of becoming a journalist, even a war correspondent who could venture into conflict zones. She later decided that she would become an actress and went on to study performing arts at Shanghai Normal University's Xie Jin Film & Television Art College.

Career

Betty Zhou was educated in Mainland China for acting, but began her acting career in Singapore, where she learnt to speak English fluently whilst preparing for the TV series Adventure Girls and Kung Fu Killer. Zhou's foray into the entertainment industry started even before she graduated from college in 2007. An overseas production company had talent-spotted Zhou and subsequently signed her on to star in Adventure Girls. As the title suggests, the travel program featured Zhou and another co-host in search of adventure in countries such as Thailand, Malaysia and the Philippines, taking part in outdoor activities such as bungee jumping, diving and rock climbing.  Zhou later got to know some industry people from Singapore and was offered an acting career there. She decided to relocate to Singapore for a few years to hone her craft, and the move paid off as she managed to gain a considerable amount of exposure there, featuring in numerous magazines and television shows. During her time there, Zhou had the honor of becoming the only actress from China to star in a leading role in an English language production.

A few years later, Zhou got to meet renowned Chinese R&B singer David Tao, who offered her a job back in China. Following this, Zhou was presented with the opportunity to front NBA coverage in her basketball-crazy country, and despite knowing nothing about the sport, she gamely took up the challenge, putting due diligence into researching the sport in order to become a credible host.  She also taught herself Cantonese for her appearances in Hong Kong.

In 2013 she started hosting basketball coverage in China on Chinese Central Television, including the weekly program Sensual NBA. Although she did not follow basketball before she began hosting basketball shows, reviews for her understanding of basketball terminology were generally positive. She was the first Chinese bilingual presenter to attend and cover the NBA Finals in 2013.

Talking to Hollywood with Betty Zhou

In May 2015 she started hosting Talking to Hollywood with Betty Zhou, a Chinese Central Television program broadcast on Baidu's iQIYI platform. It was co-created by Rob Moore and produced with the support of Paramount Pictures, Walt Disney Studios, Universal Studios, and Sony Pictures Entertainment.  As the host of Talking to Hollywood with Betty Zhou, she has rubbed shoulders with the likes of Arnold Schwarzenegger, Tom Cruise, Adam Sandler and Zoe Saldana. Created by a host of big names such as Paramount Pictures, Universal Pictures, Sony Pictures Entertainment and Walt Disney Studios, the show gives Chinese audiences an exclusive and intimate look into the world's largest entertainment industry.

Filmography

Film

Primary Works

TV Series

Live Interviews

Event Hosting

Hosting Experiences

Publications

References

External links
 
 
 
 
 
 
 

21st-century Chinese actresses
Living people
Year of birth missing (living people)
Shanghai Normal University alumni
Chinese film actresses
Chinese television actresses